The Arch of Titus is a 1st-century AD honorific arch, located on the Via Sacra, Rome, just to the south-east of the Roman Forum. It was constructed in  81 AD by the Emperor Domitian shortly after the death of his older brother Titus to commemorate Titus's official deification or consecratio and the victory of Titus together with their father, Vespasian, over the Jewish rebellion in Judaea. 

The arch contains panels depicting the triumphal procession celebrated in 71 AD after the Roman victory culminating in the fall of Jerusalem, and provides one of the few contemporary depictions of artifacts from Herod's Temple. Although the panels are not explicitly stated as illustrating this event, they closely parallel the narrative of the Roman procession described a decade prior in Josephus' The Jewish War.

It became a symbol of the Jewish diaspora, and the menorah depicted on the arch served as the model for the menorah used as the emblem of the state of Israel.

The arch has provided the general model for many triumphal arches erected since the 16th century. It is the inspiration for the Arc de Triomphe in Paris, France. It holds an important place in art history, being the focus of Franz Wickhoff's 
appreciation of Roman art in contrast to the then-prevailing view.

History
Based on the style of sculptural details, Domitian's favored architect Rabirius, sometimes credited with the Colosseum, may have executed the arch. Without contemporary documentation, however, attributions of Roman buildings on basis of style are considered shaky. The brother and successor of Titus built the arch, despite being described as hateful towards Titus by Cassius Dio.

The medieval Latin travel guide Mirabilia Urbis Romae noted the monument, writing: "the arch of the Seven Lamps of Titus and Vespasian; [where Moses' candlestick is having seven branches, with the Ark, at the foot of the Cartulary Tower"].

During the Middle Ages, the Frangipani family added a second story to the vault, converting it into a fortified tower; beam holes from the construction remain in the panels. Pope Paul IV (papacy 1555–1559) made it the place of a yearly oath of submission.

In 1716, Adriaan Reland published his De spoliis templi Hierosolymitani in arcu Titiano Romae conspicuis, in English: "The spoils of the temple of Jerusalem visible on the Arch of Titan at Rome".

It was one of the first buildings sustaining a modern restoration, starting with Raffaele Stern in 1817 and continued by Valadier under Pius VII in 1821, with new capitals and with travertine masonry, distinguishable from the original marble. The restoration was a model for the country side of Porta Pia.

At an unknown date, a local ban on Jews walking under the arch was placed on the monument by Rome's Chief Rabbinate; this was rescinded on the foundation of the State of Israel in 1948, and at a Hanukkah event in 1997 the change was made public. The arch was never mentioned in Rabbinic literature.

Description

Architecture

The arch is large with both fluted and unfluted columns, the latter being a result of 19th-century restoration.

Size
The Arch of Titus measures: 
15.4 meters (50 ft) in height, 
13.5 meters (44 ft) in width,
4.75 meters (15.5 ft) in depth.
The inner archway is 8.3 meters (27 ft) in height, and 5.36 meters (17.5 ft) in width.

Decorative sculpture
The spandrels on the upper left and right of the arch contain personifications of victory as winged women. Between the spandrels is the keystone, on which there stands a female on the east side and a male on the west side.

The soffit of the axial archway is deeply coffered with a relief of the apotheosis of Titus at the center. The sculptural program also includes two panel reliefs lining the passageway within the arch. Both commemorate the joint triumph celebrated by Titus and his father Vespasian in the summer of 71.

The south inner panel depicts the spoils taken from the Temple in Jerusalem. The golden candelabrum or Menorah is the main focus and is carved in deep relief. Other sacred objects being carried in the triumphal procession are the Gold Trumpets, the fire pans for removing the ashes from the altar, and the Table of Shewbread. 
These spoils were likely originally colored gold, with the background in blue. In 2012 the Arch of Titus Digital Restoration Project discovered remains of yellow ochre paint on the menorah relief.

The north inner panel depicts Titus as triumphator attended by various genii and lictors, who carry fasces. A helmeted Amazonian, Valour, leads the quadriga or four horsed chariot, which carries Titus. Winged Victory crowns him with a laurel wreath. The juxtaposition is significant in that it is one of the first examples of divinities and humans being present in one scene together. This contrasts with the panels of the Ara Pacis, where humans and divinities are separated.

The sculpture of the outer faces of the two great piers was lost when the Arch of Titus was incorporated in medieval defensive walls. The attic of the arch was originally crowned by more statuary, perhaps of a gilded chariot. The main inscription used to be ornamented by letters made of perhaps silver, gold or some other metal.

Inscriptions

Original inscription

The original inscription is attached to the east side of the Arch. It is written in Roman square capitals and reads:

SENATVS
POPVLVSQVE·ROMANVS
DIVO·TITO·DIVI·VESPASIANI·F(ILIO)
VESPASIANO·AVGVSTO
(Senatus Populusque Romanus divo Tito divi Vespasiani filio Vespasiano Augusto), which means

The Senate and the Roman people (dedicate this) to the deified Titus Vespasian Augustus, son of the deified Vespasian."

1821 inscription
The opposite side of the Arch of Titus received new inscriptions after it was restored during the pontificate of Pope Pius VII by Giuseppe Valadier in 1821. The restoration was intentionally made in travertine to differentiate between the original and the restored portions.

The inscription reads:

INSIGNE · RELIGIONIS · ATQVE · ARTIS · MONVMENTVM
VETVSTATE · FATISCENS
PIVS · SEPTIMVS · PONTIFEX · MAX(IMVS)
NOVIS · OPERIBVS · PRISCVM · EXEMPLAR · IMITANTIBVS
FVLCIRI · SERVARIQVE · IVSSIT
ANNO · SACRI · PRINCIPATVS · EIVS · XXIIII 

(Insigne religionis atque artis, monumentum, vetustate fatiscens: Pius Septimus, Pontifex Maximus, novis operibus priscum exemplar imitantibus fulciri servarique iussit. Anno sacri principatus eius XXIV), which means

(This) monument, remarkable in terms of both religion and art, 
had weakened from age: 
Pius the Seventh, Supreme Pontiff, 
by new works on the model of the ancient exemplar 
ordered it reinforced and preserved. 
• In the 24th year of his sacred rulership. •

Architectural influence
Works modelled on, or inspired by, the Arch of Titus include, chronologically:
 Facade of the Basilica di Sant'Andrea di Mantova (1462) by Leon Battista Alberti
 The Arc de Triomphe, Paris, France (1806)
 The Soldiers' and Sailors' Arch, Brooklyn (1892)
 The Washington Square Arch, Manhattan by Stanford White (1892)
 The temporary Dewey Arch, Manhattan (1899)
 The Fusiliers' Arch, Dublin (1907)
 The National Memorial Arch, Valley Forge National Historical Park, Pennsylvania, by Paul Philippe Cret (1910)
 The India Gate, New Delhi, India, by Edwin Lutyens (1921)

Gallery

See also

Related to the Jewish revolt
First Jewish-Roman War
Judaea Capta coinage
List of artifacts significant to the Bible
Menorah (Temple)
Showbread
Related to Roman triumph and the Arch
Ancient Roman architecture
Arch of Titus (painting)
Emblem of Israel
List of Roman triumphal arches
Roman triumph
Titus
Triumphal arch

References

Further reading
R. Ross Holloway. "Some Remarks on the Arch of Titus". L’antiquité classique. 56 (1987) pp. 183–191.
M. Pfanner. Der Titusbogen. Mainz: P. von Zabern, 1983.
L. Roman. "Martial and the City of Rome". The Journal of Roman Studies 100 (2010) pp. 1–30.

External links

Samuel Ball Platner, A Topographical Dictionary of Ancient Rome: Arch of Titus
Arch of Titus History and photos
YU-CIS: The Arch of Titus Digital Restoration Project
One Man's Campaign Against the Arch of Titus — and How It Changed Italy's Jews, by Morton Satin
The Arch of Titus history and photos
High-resolution 360° Panoramas and Images of Arch of Titus | Art Atlas
 
 

1st-century establishments in Italy
Jews and Judaism in the Roman Empire
Building projects of the Flavian dynasty
Latin inscriptions
2nd-century inscriptions
Titus
Palatine Hill
Rome R. X Campitelli
80s establishments in the Roman Empire
Titus
Siege of Jerusalem (70 CE)